The 1950 World Greco-Roman Wrestling Championship were held in Stockholm, Sweden.

Medal table

Medal summary

Men's Greco-Roman

References
FILA Database

World Wrestling Championships
W
1950 in sport wrestling
1950 in Swedish sport